Federico Gaio and Stefano Napolitano were the defending champions but only Gaio chose to defend his title, partnering Salvatore Caruso. Gaio withdrew in the first round due to a Caruso injury.

Carlos Taberner and Pol Toledo Bagué won the title after defeating Adrian Ungur and Flavio Cipolla 7–5, 6–4 in the final.

Seeds

Draw

References
 Main Draw

San Benedetto Tennis Cup - Doubles
2017 Doubles